The Technological Educational Institute of Western Macedonia (TEIWM; ; formerly Technological Educational Institute of Kozani, Τεχνολογικό Εκπαιδευτικό Ίδρυμα Κοζάνης, TEIKOZ) was a state-run institute of highest education based in Kozani, Greece.

The institution also operated satellite campuses in the nearby towns of Kastoria, Florina, Grevena and Ptolemaida.

History 
Formerly known as TEI of Western Macedonia, now University of Western Macedonia, was established in 1976 as a vocational school, and was accredited as a Higher (1983) and later Highest (2001) Educational Institution. A series of legislative acts solidified the equality of universities of applied sciences with Greek universities (Ν.2916/2001, Ν.3549/2007, Ν.3685/2008, Ν.3794/2009, N.4001/2011). On the 25th of February in 2019, TEI of Western Macedonia merged with the University of Western Macedonia, and together they formed the existing University of Western Macedonia with its main campus in Kozani.

Schools and departments
The university includes four Schools, consisting of eleven Departments.

Academic evaluation
In 2016 the external evaluation committee gave TEI of Western Macedonia a Positive evaluation.

The ATHENA Reform Plan restructured the institute's departments in 2013.

See also
 University of Western Macedonia
 List of universities in Greece
 TEI of Central Macedonia

References

External links
 TEI of Western Macedonia - Official Webpage 
 Hellenic Quality Assurance and Accreditation Agency (HQA) 

West Macedonia
Educational institutions established in 1976
Education in Western Macedonia
1976 establishments in Greece
Buildings and structures in Western Macedonia